Jonas Häkkinen (born March 21, 1999) is a professional footballer who currently plays for Irish club Cork City. Born in Canada, he has represented Finland at youth level.

Early life
Born in Vancouver, Canada, to Finnish parents from Turku, Häkkinen holds dual citizenship of Canada and Finland.

Club career

VPS
On November 11, 2018, Häkkinen left Canada to join VPS in Finland. He departed the team upon their relegation to the Ykkönen at the end of the season.

FC Haka
Häkkinen signed with newly promoted side FC Haka on January 22, 2020.

Cork City
Häkkinen signed contract with League of Ireland First Division team Cork City.

International career

Canada
In 2013, Häkkinen was part of an identification camp for the Canadian under-15 program.

Finland
Häkkinen made his debut for the Finland Under-21 national team against North Macedonia on June 6, 2019.

References

1999 births
Living people
Soccer players from Vancouver
Finnish footballers
Finland youth international footballers
Canadian soccer players
Canadian people of Finnish descent
FC Haka players
Vaasan Palloseura players
Cork City F.C. players
League of Ireland players
Expatriate association footballers in the Republic of Ireland
Association football midfielders
Association football defenders